Seren Books is the trading name of Poetry Wales Press, an independent publisher based in Bridgend, Wales, specialising in English-language writing from Wales and also publishing other literary fiction, poetry and non-fiction. Seren's aim is to bring Welsh literature and culture to a wider audience. The press takes its name from the Welsh word for "star".

History
The press was founded in 1981 by Cary Archard, a teacher who was then the editor of the quarterly magazine Poetry Wales. He decided to branch into publishing poetry collections and gained funding from the Arts Council of Wales, initially on an ad hoc basis. At first known as Poetry Wales Press, it was published from Archard's home in Bridgend. An early office was in Dannie Abse's house in Ogmore by Sea. According to the academic Sam Adams, Archard's twin initial aims were to encourage Welsh poets writing in the English language, particularly the younger generation; and to republish out-of-print works and thus make more sources available for teaching Welsh literature in English. The first collections from the press were by Mike Jenkins and Nigel Jenkins, together with a retrospective collection featuring Abse. Literary criticism was also part of its output from the outset. 

In 1982, Poetry Wales Press received a block grant from the Arts Council of Wales, the first of its kind, which enabled it to set up an office in Bridgend and to appoint a full-time manager, Mick Felton. The grant later came from the Welsh Books Council; it was reassessed annually. In 1985, the press adopted the Seren imprint for works that were not poetry, and from 1989 the Seren imprint has been used for all publications. In 1986, an independent editor was appointed to oversee Poetry Wales. Since its foundation, the press has branched into literary fiction, biography and non-fiction. In 2011, Seren published 20–25 titles annually. Archard retired as manager in 1996; the press has subsequently been run by Felton. The board of directors has included Abse (from 1989) and the academic M. Wynn Thomas (1993–2003). The press remains based in Bridgend.

Mick Felton is currently the fiction and nonfiction editor for the press, and Rhian Edwards and Zoë Brigley work as its poetry editor, having replaced editor Amy Wack in 2022. 

Seren has run the Seren Cardiff Poetry Festival since 2018; the 2021 festival was held online due to Covid-19 pandemic.

Authors and series
Seren retains a strong poetry list, which still includes Poetry Wales. It includes some well-known poets such as Dannie Abse, Kathryn Gray. Kim Moore, Katrina Naomi, Pascale Petit, Sheenagh Pugh, and Owen Sheers,. Novelists include Richard Collins, whose debut work, The Land as Viewed from the Sea, was shortlisted for a Whitbread Award in 2004; Lloyd Jones, whose novel Mr Cassini won the English-language Wales Book of the Year award in 2007; and Patrick McGuinness, whose debut novel The Last Hundred Days was longlisted for the Man Booker Prize in 2011. Other writers have included Ivy Alvarez, Ruth Bidgood, Tony Curtis, Dic Edwards, Rhian Edwards, Catherine Fisher, Raymond Garlick, Paul Groves, Paul Henry, Glyn Jones, Mike Jenkins, Alun Lewis, Gary Ley, Christopher Meredith, Francesca Rhydderch, Edward Thomas, R. S. Thomas and John Tripp.

A classics series has republished important works by Rhys Davies, Caradoc Evans, Margiad Evans and Gwyn Thomas, which were first published by English publishers. Another project invites authors including Fflur Dafydd, Lloyd Jones and Gwyneth Lewis to recreate the Mabinogion in new settings.

Reception
Seren Books is part of the "big six" of poetry publishers in the UK, which also includes Bloodaxe, Carcanet, Jonathan Cape, Picador and Faber. The academic Lisa Sheppard describes Seren, together with Parthian and Cinnamon Press, as "among the foremost publishers of English-language writing in Wales". According to Sheppard, Seren and Parthian are "illuminating Welsh writing in English's past and creating links with the Welsh language tradition in order to claim anglophone literature as part of Wales's literary heritage". The Welsh poet Dannie Abse describes Seren on its thirtieth anniversary in 2011 as a "vital element of the Welsh literary scene" and considers it to have contributed to the strength of English-language writing in Wales. The Welsh poet Owen Sheers describes the press in 2011 as "a sign of national and cultural strength" and "a way of allowing a country a voice".

Peter Finch, who has himself been published by Seren, named the late poet Nigel Jenkins as one who disliked Seren's approach. The Welsh poet Tony Curtis said in an interview published in 1997 that "Seren's books look good, and their list is good. Some of it could improve, but that's part of the process"; he criticised the press's marketing for failing to get its books into bookshops.

References

Sources
Lisa Sheppard. "Literary Periodicals and the Publishing Industry", in The Cambridge History of Welsh Literature (Geraint Evans, Helen Fulton, eds), p. 596 (Cambridge University Press; 2019) ,

External links

Publishing companies of Wales
Publishing companies established in 1981
1981 establishments in Wales